Mission Hills or Mission Hill may refer to:

Places

Communities
In the United States (alphabetically by state)

 Mission Hills, Santa Barbara County, California, a town north of the city of Lompoc
 Mission Hills, Los Angeles, California, in the San Fernando Valley
 Mission Hills, San Diego, California, an old subdivision in north-central San Diego
 Mission Hills, Kansas, in Johnson County
 Mission Hill, Boston, Massachusetts, a residential neighborhood
 Mission Hill, South Dakota, a town in Yankton County
 Mission Hills, a neighborhood in west central El Paso, Texas

Golf courses
 Mission Hills Country Club, in Rancho Mirage, California
 Mission Hills Country Club (Kansas), in the Kansas City metropolitan area
 Mission Hills Golf Club, in Shenzhen, China
 Mission Hills Haikou, in the province of Hainan, China

Other places
 Mission Hill Family Estate, a wine grower and producer based in West Kelowna, British Columbia, Canada
 Mission Hills station, a station of the Shenzhen Metro in China

Schools
 Bromsgrove School Mission Hills, in Shenzhen, China
 Mission Hill School, in the Jamaica Plain neighborhood of Boston, Massachusetts
 Mission Hills High School, in San Marcos, California

Other uses
 Mission Hill (TV series), an American animated television series
 Mission Hills Star Trophy, an annual, pro-celebrity golf tournament held in Hainan, China

See also
 
 
 Mission Mountain (disambiguation)
 Mission Peak, near Fremont, California
 Mission Ridge (disambiguation)
 Mission Terrace, in San Francisco, California